Bharat Khanna (22 June 1914 – 1993) was an Indian cricketer. He played first-class cricket for Cambridge University, Hyderabad and Madras between 1932 and 1953.

See also
 List of Hyderabad cricketers
 List of Cambridge University Cricket Club players

References

External links
 

1914 births
1993 deaths
Indian cricketers
Cambridge University cricketers
Hyderabad cricketers
Tamil Nadu cricketers
Place of birth missing